Bianchi motorcycles were made from 1897 to 1967 by F.I.V. Edoardo Bianchi S.p.A., a company which today is a major Italian bicycle manufacturer, and who also produced automobiles from 1900 to 1939. Edoardo Bianchi started his bicycle manufacturing business in a small shop on Milan's Via Nirone in 1885. Bianchi was a prominent name in the motorcycle racing world from 1925 to 1930.

Early history
Edoardo Bianchi was an Italian motorcycling pioneer who began by building bicycles in 1885. He built a motorised bicycle in 1897, and a car in 1900. In 1903 he fitted engines in the centre of strengthened bicycle frames, and by 1905 also fitted Truffault leading link forks. In 1910 Bianchi built a 498 cc single that was very successful and established the Bianchi motorcycle name.

In 1916 a 650 cc V-twin was made, which was enlarged to 741 cc in 1920. In 1921 a smaller 598 cc V-twin, and a new 498 cc single with all chain drive was released. There was a 348 cc side valve single for 1923, and V-twins of 498 cc and 598 cc. In 1924 a 173 cc overhead valve single was added to the range.

Racing History
In 1925 a 348 cc overhead valve (OHV) single was introduced. There was also a 348 cc dual overhead cam (DOHC) works racer, designed by Albino Baldi, Bianchi chief engineer, and these Bianchis were the most successful Italian racing bikes for the next five years. During this time the bike was ridden by such riders as Tazio Nuvolari, Amilcare Moretti, Mario Ghersi, Karl Kodric, Gino Zanchetta and Luigi Arcangeli.

In the 1930s Baldi designed another racing bike, a 498cc ohc single. This bike was ridden by such riders as Giordano Aldrighetti, Aldo Pigarini, Terzo Bandini, Dorino Serafini, Guido Cerato and Alberto Ascari. In 1938 a supercharged four cylinder 498 cc DOHC racer was built, but was never fully developed.

European championships

Post war
After World War II Bianchi produced 123 cc and 248 cc ohc single racers, and in the late 1950s released new 248 cc and 348 cc dohc twins, designed by Colombo and Lino Tonti. There were a few over-bored 498 cc works versions for the 500 cc class races. In 1946 Edoardo died, and control of the firm passed to his son Giuseppe.

Bianchi production motorcycles included 49cc models, the 75 Gardena, 122 and 173cc two strokes, the 4-stroke 125cc Bianchi Bernina LV, and the Bianchi Tonale, a 173 cc chain driven ohc single. Some 49 cc two stroke engines were built under licence from Puch, and fitted into the innovative Falco, one or two seat moped. This sprightly ride featured a one piece, pressed girder frame and three speed gearbox operated via the left hand twist grip/clutch lever. In 1961, Bob McIntyre rode a Bianchi 350 cc in the Motorcycle Grand Prix World Championships. Motorcycle production ceased in 1967, when all rights passed to Innocenti. Small mopeds made by Bianchi were imported by American retailer Montgomery Ward and sold via catalog under the Riverside captive import brand.

List of Motorcycle Models (incomplete) 

175
450
500
600
350 Blue Arrow
Bernina
Tonale 175
Tonale Sport

See also

 Autobianchi (1955 - 1995)
 Bianchi (bicycle manufacturer) (1885 – present)
 List of motorcycles of the 1910s
 List of motorcycles of the 1920s

Notes

References

External links

Bianchi Corporate site
Bianchi USA US site

Italian companies established in 1897
Vehicle manufacturing companies established in 1897
Vehicle manufacturing companies disestablished in 1967
Bianchi (company)